Ahmad Al-Khuwailid Mustafa (Arabic:أحمد الخويلد مصطفى; born 29 January 2000) is an Indonesian professional footballer who plays as a midfielder for Qatar Stars League club Qatar SC.

Football career
Khuwailid has been in Al-Duhail since he was 10 years old. In 2020 he played for the Al Duhail U-23 team and won the Qatar U-23 League title, he was promoted to the first team since the start of the season.

This season he has mostly sat on the bench and rarely gets the chance to play. He was successful with his team at the junior level, namely U-19. Khuwailid appeared regularly in these two age groups. In addition to the two age levels, this 19-year-old player has also successfully won the U-19 Cup.

He made his professional debut in the Qatar Stars League on 9 April 2021, against Al Sadd where he played as a substitute.

Personal life
Khuwailid Mustafa was born on January 29, 2000, in Lhokseumawe, Aceh to Mustafa Ibrahim and Yulizar Syamsuddin. Together with his family, he moved to Qatar when he was 5 years old.

Career statistics

Club

Notes

References

External links
 

2000 births
Living people
Qatari footballers
Indonesian footballers
Indonesian expatriate footballers
Indonesian emigrants to Qatar
Qatari people of Indonesian descent
Naturalised citizens of Qatar
Al-Duhail SC players
Qatar SC players
Qatar Stars League players
Association football midfielders
People from Lhokseumawe
Sportspeople from Aceh